Memecylon ellipticum is a species of plant in the family Melastomataceae. It is endemic to Sri Lanka.

References

Endemic flora of Sri Lanka
ellipticum
Endangered plants
Taxonomy articles created by Polbot